Sorkheh Misheh (also Romanized as Sorkheh Mīsheh; also known as Sorkheh Mesheh, Sorkh Mīsheh, and Surkha-Masha) is a village in Chavarzaq Rural District, Chavarzaq District, Tarom County, Zanjan Province, Iran. At the 2006 census, its population was 343, in 75 families.

References 

Populated places in Tarom County